Léon Casgrain (August 13, 1892 – November 5, 1967) was a Canadian politician and jurist from Quebec.

Biography

He was born on August 13, 1892 in Rivière-Ouelle and was an attorney.

He ran as a Liberal candidate in 1927 for the district of Témiscouata and won.  He was re-elected in the district of Rivière-du-Loup in 1931, 1935, 1936, 1939 (in Kamouraska–Rivière-du-Loup for that year only) and 1944.  Casgrain was defeated in 1948 against Union Nationale candidate Roméo Gagné. He became Minister without Portfolio in 1939 and served as the province's Attorney General from 1942 to 1944.

In 1948, he was appointed a puisne judge of the Superior Court of Quebec, retiring in 1967.

Casgrain died on November 5, 1967 in Rivière-du-Loup, Quebec.

Footnotes

1892 births
1967 deaths
Quebec Liberal Party MNAs
People from Bas-Saint-Laurent
Vice Presidents of the National Assembly of Quebec
Beaubien-Casgrain family
Judges in Quebec
Université Laval alumni